Limnochromis abeelei is a species of cichlid endemic to Lake Tanganyika where it occurs in deeper waters in the southern portion of the lake.  This species can reach a length of  TL. Some authorities place this species in the genus Greenwoodochromis. The specific name honours the Belgian colonial administrator M.M. van den Abeele who supported the Belgian Hydrobiological Mission to Lake Tanganyika (1946-1947), on which type was collected.

References

Fauna of Zambia
Abeelei
Fish described in 1949
Endemic fauna of Zambia
Taxa named by Max Poll
Taxonomy articles created by Polbot